Plegaderus is a genus of clown beetles in the family Histeridae. There are more than 30 described species in Plegaderus.

Species
These 31 species belong to the genus Plegaderus:

 Plegaderus adonis Marseul, 1876
 Plegaderus barbelini Marseul, 1862
 Plegaderus caesus (Herbst, 1791)
 Plegaderus comonforti Marseul, 1862
 Plegaderus confusus Bousquet & Laplante, 1999
 Plegaderus consors Horn, 1873
 Plegaderus convergens Casey, 1916
 Plegaderus cribratus Casey, 1893
 Plegaderus densus Casey, 1916
 Plegaderus discisus Erichson, 1839
 Plegaderus dissectus Erichson, 1839
 Plegaderus erichsoni LeConte, 1863
 Plegaderus fortesculptus Reitter, 1897
 Plegaderus fraternus Horn, 1870
 Plegaderus marseuli Reitter, 1877
 Plegaderus molestus Casey, 1893
 Plegaderus monachus Marseul, 1870
 Plegaderus nitidus Horn, 1870
 Plegaderus obesus Casey, 1916
 Plegaderus otti Marseul, 1856
 Plegaderus pygidialis Casey, 1916
 Plegaderus rigidus Casey, 1893
 Plegaderus sanatus Truqui, 1852
 Plegaderus saucius Erichson, 1834
 Plegaderus sayi Marseul, 1856
 Plegaderus setulosus Ross, 1938
 Plegaderus shikokensis Hisamatsu, 1985
 Plegaderus sulcatus Casey
 Plegaderus transversus (Say, 1825)
 Plegaderus vegrandis Casey
 Plegaderus vulneratus (Panzer, 1797)

References

Further reading

External links

 

Histeridae
Articles created by Qbugbot